The Dancing Forest is a pine forest on the Curonian Spit in Kaliningrad Oblast, Russia noted for its unusually twisted trees. Unlike drunken trees, the trees in the Dancing Forest are twisted into several patterns, such as rings, hearts and convoluted spirals bending to the ground. The exact cause of the trees' distortion is unknown. According to one version, the distortion is caused by the activity of the caterpillar of Rhyacionia buoliana. In the folk version, the Dancing Forest follows the movement of the sands.

History
The trees were planted in the 1960s. Before World War II the site accommodated a Nazi German gliding school.

See also
 Crooked Forest

References

Forests of Russia
Geography of Kaliningrad Oblast